Square of Contracts or Contract Square (translit.: Kontraktova ploshcha) is a square in the historic Podil neighborhood of Kyiv, the capital of Ukraine. The square is an important economic, cultural, and transport center of the Podil, containing numerous architectural and historical monuments.

History

Contract Square is known since the Kyivan Rus' times as an important part of the Podil merchant neighborhood. The square lies in between the Andriyivskyy Descent, Sahaidachny, Pokrivska, Florivska, Prytisko-Mykilska, Kostiantynivska, Mezhyhirska, Spaska, Skovorody and Ilynska streets.

The construction of the Contracts House, a permanent trading center where contracts were signed, at the end of the 18th century gave the square its current name. During 1748-1749, the Fountain of Samson was built to repair the water distribution system of the area to a design by Ukrainian architect Ivan Hryhorovych-Barskyi. The compound of the National University of Kyiv-Mohyla Academy, one of Ukraine's leading universities dating back to 16th century, adjoins the square.

In the 1970s, archaeological works conducted by the Institute of Archaeology of the Ukrainian SSR were done on the square, as well as reconstructions of the square's main constructions.

The square was renamed several times during its history: in 1869-1919 the square was named Alexander Square in honour of the Russian emperor Alexander II; in 1919-1944 it was named Red Square, dedicated to Communism; between 1945 and the 1950s, it was renamed back to Contracts, although Red continued to be widely used among elder people; in 1990, the original name was re-established.

Modern square

Today, the Contracts Square is an important center of the Podil neighborhood, and also a recreational, cultural and transportation point of the city.

The square is often used for various outdoor public festivities, including music concerts and fairs. The Petro Sahaidachnyi Street which leads to the square is limited to pedestrians on weekends.

Buildings and structures
Listed clockwise from the Sahaidachnyi Street:

 Monument to Petro Konashevych-Sahaidachny, a Cossack Hetman;
 Hosting Court building of the 19th century and the main feature of the town square;
 Contracts House, where contracts were signed;
 Fountain of Samson, reconstructed architectural monument;
 Children's Musical Theater;
 Monument to Hryhoriy Skovoroda, a poet, philosopher, and composer;
 Compound of the Kyiv-Mohyla Academy (including Soros Center for Contemporary Art in the corner building);
 Building of the National Bank's city branch (formerly the "Greek Monastery");
 Church of the Mother of God Pyrohoshcha.

Transportation center

Contracts Square is one of the largest and oldest transport hub of the Kyiv tram system, end stop for several tram routes. However, tram lines crossing the square are being gradually phased out since the 1980s.

Most importantly, Contracts Square adjoins the Kyiv Metro Kontraktova Ploshcha Station, thus forming a multi-modal passenger knot with the tram and minibus lines. The station has a sub-surface design with four entrances, two of them being outside the square.

References and footnotes

Squares in Kyiv
Tourist attractions in Kyiv
Podilskyi District